Bernhard Heinrich Overberg (1 May 1754 – November 8, 1826) was a German Roman Catholic ecclesiastic, educator and author. As an instructor of the teachers he shaped the educational level in Münster and Westphalia.

Biography
Overberg was born of peasant parents in the village of Höckel, near Osnabrück, and became a pedlar like his father. At fifteen a priest prepared him for college, and he studied with the Franciscans in Rheine. From 1774 he studied in Münster, and was ordained priest in 1779. As curate in Everswinkel he did such good work in teaching religion that the vicar-general, Freiherr von Furstenberg, offered him the position of director of the normal school, which he was about to found in Münster.
 
Thenceforth he was Fürstenberg's right hand in the reorganization and reformation of the schools. In 1783 he settled in Münster, where his first duty was to conduct a course of practical and theoretical study for schoolteachers during the autumn vacation. This institution was known as the Normalschule. The village schools at that time were very poor; in Prussia a number of discharged non-commissioned officers made a pretence of teaching, while in Westphalia, mere day labourers wielded the "stick" (of class discipline).

His aim was to educate and instruct teachers and to improve their wretched material circumstances. All the teachers were to take part in the course at public expense. The course closed with an examination, and those who passed it obtained an increase in salary. As Overberg considered it best to separate the sexes in his schools, he instructed a number of women teachers who eagerly accepted the work. At first, Overberg himself instructed the teachers, giving five lessons daily between 21 August to November, and teaching method as well as the various school subjects. He recommended teaching conversations instead of pure memorization. As instructor of the teachers he shaped the educational level in Münster and Westphalia.

Later he employed an assistant teacher. Soon his normal school was attended by young people who wished to become teachers. This normal school, therefore, became what is now known in Germany as a Seminary, and had more than 100 pupils (at first 20-30). Besides teaching in this school he gave instruction in the catechism for twenty-seven years in the Ursuline convent without remuneration. Every Sunday he recapitulated all that he had lectured upon during the week in a public lecture which was attended by people of all classes, especially by students of theology.

In 1789, Princess Adelheid Amalie Gallitzin chose him as her confessor. He influenced her entire activity, and met in her company the most important men of the times. By his tactful kindness he brought about the conversion of Count Friedrich Leopold zu Stolberg. He remained director of the normal school even when he became regent of the ecclesiastical seminary in 1809, before which he had been for some time synodal examiner and member of the Landschulkommission. 

In 1818 he was awarded 1818 the Prussian Red Eagle, and in 1823, honorary member of the cathedral chapter.

Overberg died 8 November 1826. His grave is located in the choir of the Überwasserkirche in Münster, where he was dean and pastor. In 2004, Voltlage commemorated the 250th anniversary of his birth with a number of events. Bishop Franz-Josef Bode from Osnabrück celebrated the closing mass of the festival year. Numerous educational institutions and streets are named after Overberg.

Works
 Anweisung zum zweckmässigen Schulunterricht (1797) (Instructions for practical school lessons for the school teachers in the Hochstifte Münster)
 Biblische Geschichte (1799)
 Christkatholisches Religionsbuch (1804)
 Katechismus der christlichen Lehre (1804)
 Sechs Bücher vom Priesterstande (1858)

References

External links

Online Biography of Bernhard Heinrich Overberg (in German)

People from Osnabrück (district)
1754 births
1826 deaths